The 1992–93 season was the 83rd season in Cádiz CF’s history.

Squad

Left club during season

Squad stats 
Last updated on 14 March 2021.

|-
|colspan="14"|Players who have left the club after the start of the season:

|}

Competitions

Overall

La Liga

Copa del Rey

References

Cádiz CF seasons
Cádiz CF